Hindo Kasimov was a Bulgarian stage and film actor born in 1934, deceased in 1986.

He is best known for the television comedy sketches performed by him together with leading Bulgarian actors as Vasil Popov, Georgi Partsalev, Stoyanka Mutafova and others. He is also known for the numerous roles on the stage of the Satirical Theatre „Aleko Konstantinov“, Sofia where he remained until his untimely death in 1986. Some notable appearances on the stage include the plays “Marriage” by Nikolai Gogol, “Doctor” by Branislav Nušić and “January” by Yordan Radichkov.  Kasimov is in the cast of the popular TV musical The Phoney Civilization released by the Bulgarian National Television in 1974.

Selected filmography

Selected theatre appearances
The following table presents the Kasimov's appearances on the stage of the Satirical Theatre “Aleko Konstantinov”, Sofia.

References

Sources

External links
 

Bulgarian male film actors
Bulgarian male stage actors
Bulgarian male television actors
1934 births
1986 deaths
Actors from Burgas
20th-century Bulgarian male actors